S.H.E, a Taiwanese girl group, has won numerous awards since entering the Mandopop industry. Formed in 2001, the group's members are Selina Ren, Hebe Tien, and Ella Chen. Ren, Tien, and Chen all participated in the 2001 Universal Talent and Beauty Girl Contest, the winner of which would join Power Station on HIM International Music's roster. Although Ren had won the contest, Tien and Chen joined Ren in forming S.H.E. Since their debut in 2001, the trio has recorded eleven albums in six years, and sales have exceeded 4.5 million since the release of their first album Girls Dorm. S.H.E's third album, Genesis, was recognized with more awards than any other work. In 2003, the album's success culminated in Best Group honours at both the Golden Melody Awards and the Singapore Hit Awards.

The group's most successful songs to date are "Don't Wanna Grow Up" (Once Upon a Time) and "Chinese Language" (Play). Although the latter song drew considerable cross-straits controversy, it won six awards—one of which was Sina Hong Kong's Mandarin Song of the Year—and earned three additional nominations. Between 2006 and 2007, "Don't Wanna Grow Up" also earned six awards. On a year-by-year basis, S.H.E was most successful in 2007, when the group won 32 awards from 44 nominations. Honours received that year include seventeen awards for either Best or Most Popular Group, twelve for song-related categories, one for Best Album, one for Best Soundtrack, and one for Best Music Video. With over 130 awards to S.H.E's credit, the success of the group led to the formation of more Taiwanese pop groups, including i.n.g, Michelle*Vickie, G-Boys, and 7 Flowers.

CMA Awards
Since 1994, the CMA Awards have been given annually by the television network Channel [V]. Awards are split into two regional categories: Mainland China and Hong Kong (HK)/Taiwan. S.H.E has won one award from fourteen nominations.

Global Chinese Music Awards
The Global Chinese Music Awards are given annually by a group of seven radio stations: 988 (Malaysia), Beijing Music Radio, Hit FM, Music FM Radio Guangdong, RTHK, Shanghai Radio 101.7 FM, and YES 933. S.H.E has won eight Global Chinese Music Awards. In 2002, three songs—"Message of Blessedness", "Tropical Rainforest" and "Beauty Up My Life"—combined to form S.H.E's nomination for Best New Artist. However, the gold, silver, and bronze awards for the female subdivision of that category went to Twins, Snow Wei, and Peggy Hsu, respectively. In 2003, four songs—"Genesis", "Always on My Mind", "White Love Song", and "Irreplacable"—collectively formed the group's nomination for Best Group; the trio ultimately shared the Silver Award with Twins in that category. 2003 was, in fact, the last year in which Gold, Silver and Bronze Awards were given in the Best Group category; since then, recipients of the award have been named co-winners. From 2005–2007, Twins and Yu Quan were the only other co-recipients of the Best Group award.

In 2006, Selina won an additional award for her duet with Tank. In 2007, Hebe earned two nominations for her duet with Fahrenheit, but did not win.

Golden Melody Awards
The Golden Melody Awards (GMA) are awarded annually by the Government Information Office (GIO) of the Republic of China. S.H.E has won one GMA from seven nominations. Nominees for the Best Vocal Collaboration awards are named based on the best album they released that year, as determined by the GIO. In 2007, S.H.E was listed as one of the Most Popular Female Artists in Taiwan, but lost the award to Jolin Tsai.

HITO Radio Music Awards
The HITO Radio Music Awards are given annually by HITO Radio, the parent company of Taiwanese radio station Hit FM. S.H.E has won fifteen of these awards. One of these awards was won in 2008 for contributing to the Hanazakarino Kimitachihe OST. In 2007, Selina won an award for "You are a Song in My Heart", her duet with Leehom Wang.

IFPI Hong Kong Album Sales Awards
The IFPI Hong Kong Album Sales Awards, formerly Gold Record Awards (金唱片頒獎典禮) is presented by the Hong Kong branch of International Federation of the Phonographic Industry (IFPI) since 1977. The order is not specified for the Top 10 Selling Mandarin Albums of the Year (十大銷量國語唱片獲獎).

Global Chinese Golden Chart Awards
The Global Chinese Golden Chart Awards are music awards founded by China National Radio and Hit FM in 2009.

Malaysian Golden Melody Awards
The Malaysian Golden Melody Awards were given annually by the radio station 988. Ceremonies were held from 2001 to 2003 at the Genting Highlands Resort. S.H.E won five of these awards, including two Gold Awards for Best Group.

Metro Radio Mandarin Music Awards
The Metro Radio Mandarin Music Awards are given annually by the Hong Kong radio station Metro Info. S.H.E has won nineteen Metro Radio awards. In 2007, Hebe earned a nomination for Best Female Artist, and won an additional award for her duet with boy band Fahrenheit. In 2008, S.H.E shared a Best Duet Song award with Fahrenheit for the song "New Home", the opening theme for Romantic Princess.

Metro Radio Hit Awards
The Metro Radio Hit Awards (新城勁爆頒獎禮), like the Metro Radio Mandarin Music Awards, are given annually (usually in December) by Hong Kong radio station Metro Info. In contrast to the Mandarin Music Awards, the Hit Awards focuses on Cantopop music, and provide a few honours for Mandarin-language music. S.H.E has won six of these awards.

MTV Asia Awards
Since 2002, the MTV Asia Awards have been held every year except 2007. The 2005 edition of the ceremonies paid tribute to the victims of the 2004 Tsunami. S.H.E has received five nominations for being Taiwan's Favourite Artist.

RTHK Chinese Gold Song Awards
The RTHK Chinese Gold Song Awards are given annually by Radio and Television Hong Kong. Ceremonies are held once a year between late December to early January, and honour works produced in the previous year. An exception to this rule occurred in 2003, when the 25th and 26th editions of the awards show were both held in the same year. The 25th iteration, held in January 2003, served as the 2002 edition; the 26th iteration, held in December 2003, served as the 2003 edition. As a result, the 27th iteration (2004 edition) was pushed to January 2005. S.H.E has won four awards from nine nominations.

Singapore Hit Awards
The Singapore Hit Awards are given annually by the radio station YES 933. S.H.E, who won fourteen of these awards, has been honoured every year except 2005 and 2006. Performers earn nominations (except for songs) based on the album(s) they released that particular year. Between the 2003 and 2004 Singapore Hit Awards, S.H.E released two albums, which is why both were included in the trio's 2004 Best Group nomination. From 2003 to 2004, six songs—"He Still Doesn't Understand", "Super Star", "Persian Cat", "Faraway", "The Flowers Have Blossomed", and "When the Angels Sing"—stayed on the YES 933 charts for a combined 76 weeks; this achievement earned the group a Best Chart Performance award at the 2004 Singapore Hit Awards. In 2007, S.H.E and Stefanie Sun were both honoured with the Asia Media Award.

Hong Kong TVB8 Awards
The Hong Kong TVB8 Awards are given annually by TVB8, a Mandarin television network operated by Television Broadcasts Limited. S.H.E has won nine of these awards. In 2005, Vincent Fang earned a nomination for his lyrics in "Migratory Bird", the lead single for Encore.

Annual Music Chart Awards
The Annual Music Chart Awards hand out awards for Cantopop and Mandopop artists in Greater China. The ceremony has been sponsored by numerous companies over the years—Cici (2001), Pepsi (2002–2006), and Mengniu (2007). S.H.E has won four of these awards.

Canada's Best Chinese Hits Chart
Canada's Best Chinese Hits Chart is a set of awards handed out annually by Fairchild Radio. The awards honour work produced in the previous year. S.H.E has won six of these awards. In 2008, Selina won an additional award for her duet with Leehom Wang.

KKBOX Music Awards
The KKBOX Music Awards are given annually by the Taiwanese online music store KKBOX, and recognize works produced in the previous calendar year. Thus, an awards show taking place in 2005 would be labelled "The 2004 KKBOX Music Awards" to recognize work produced in 2004. S.H.E has won four of these awards. Two other awards were credited to the trio's contributions to soundtracks. Hebe won an award in 2007 for her duet with Fahrenheit.

Sprite Music Awards
The Sprite Music Awards are given annually by Sprite China to honour the best in the music industry for the previous calendar year; an awards show taking place in 2005 would be labelled "The 2004 Sprite Music Awards" to recognize work produced in 2004. S.H.E has won 13 of these awards. Hebe won an additional award in 2007 for her duet with Fahrenheit.

Individual and shared honours

As individuals or featured artists

Selina
Selina has won three awards, all of which have come from duets with other artists. In 2006, "Solo Madrigal" (獨唱情歌), her duet with Tank, was named Best Duet Song at the 6th Global Chinese Music Awards. Two years later, she earned four awards for her duet with Leehom Wang.

Hebe
Hebe has earned three awards from six nominations, all of which have come from being a featured artist on Fahrenheit's song "Only Have Feelings for You" (只對你有感覺). At the 7th Global Chinese Music Awards, Hebe became the first S.H.E member to earn a nomination for Best Female Artist.

Ella
Ella is the first S.H.E member to be nominated for an acting award. In 2006, her performance as Ren Jie in Reaching for the Stars put her in contention for the Best Actress Award (Movie or Drama); Yang Li-yin ultimately won for her role in Cao Shan Chun Hui (草山春暉). Despite the loss, Ella was voted Best Dressed at the 41st Golden Bell Awards.

Shared
S.H.E has earned six awards from eleven nominations in collaboration with various artists; three of these awards have come from soundtracks produced by HIM International Music. Nominated six times, S.H.E's duets with Fahrenheit have earned three awards, all of which were credited to "New Home". "Thanks for Your Gentleness" earned a nomination for Best Duet Song at the 7th Global Chinese Music Awards.

Other awards
S.H.E has been honoured as the year's best or most popular pop group ten additional times. Among these, three recognized them as the best group in Hong Kong and Taiwan. In 2006, the trio collected an additional bronze award in the Best Group category. S.H.E's songs have received five additional honours. "Persian Cat" and "Don't Wanna Grow Up" were among the top 10 songs of the year in 2004 and 2007, respectively. In 2008, "Chinese Language" received an award for Best Music Video, and was Sina Hong Kong's Mandarin song of the year. Later that year, S.H.E received a sales award for their songs, which were downloaded more than those of any other group in 2008.

Footnotes

The years in the table indicate the year in which the awards show took place. If the 2004 edition of an awards show takes place in 2005, the table will indicate the latter year.
In the infobox, award names are shown in dark blue if they have been organized more than twice by either a government body or an Asia-based media company. All other awards are shown in light blue.

 Although S.H.E won this award for singing one of the year's top songs or being one of the year's top artists, no specific ranking is ever mentioned.

 From the first year this award was given out until 2008, some or all nomination lists are not disclosed. If an awards ceremony had been held before 2001, only nomination lists from 2001 onward will be looked at. If no post-2001 nominations lists can be found for these pre-2001 ceremonies, an asterisk is placed next to the number of nominations for the relevant awards.

 "He Still Doesn't Understand" charted for 17 weeks from March 7, 2004 to June 27, 2004. "Persian Cat" charted for 14 weeks from February 8, 2004 to May 9, 2004. "Super Star" charted for 14 weeks from August 31, 2003 to November 30, 2003. "Faraway" charted for 10 weeks from September 28, 2003 to November 30, 2003. "The Flowers have Blossomed" charted for 10 weeks from July 13, 2003 to September 14, 2003. "When the Angels Sing" charted for 11 weeks from May 18, 2003 to July 27, 2003.

References

She
She
Awards